The molecular formula C12H12N2O2S (molar mass: 248.30 g/mol, exact mass: 248.0619 u) may refer to:

 Enoximone
 Dapsone, or diaminodiphenyl sulfone(DDS)

Molecular formulas